Geantraí is an Irish television programme, presenting Irish traditional music.

The name derives from Geantraí, one of the three types of Irish music enumerated in the "three noble strains"; geantraí (joy music), suantraí (lullaby) and goltraí (sorrow music). In Old Irish, they were spelled geantraige, suantraige, goltraige.

References

External links 

Official site 

Irish-language television shows
1990s Irish television series
2000s Irish television series
2010s Irish television series
TG4 original programming
1996 Irish television series debuts
Irish folk music
Musical television series
Live music